"Amnesia" is the second single from English rock band Chumbawamba's eighth studio album, Tubthumper (1997). The song's lyrics address the sense of betrayal that English leftists felt during the rise of New Labour. Released on 19 January 1998, the song was met with favorable reception from critics, who regarded the song as a highlight from Tubthumper.

The song was a top-10 hit in Canada and the United Kingdom, giving the group their final top-20 entries in both countries. The song also reached number one on the Billboard Bubbling Under Hot 100, becoming the group's final US chart entry. An accompanying music video was also released.

Background and writing
"Amnesia" lyrically explores the dishonesty of politicians and the ignorance of voters who continue to vote them into office. Chumbawamba's Alice Nutter told MTV that the group "wrote "Amnesia' before the general election in England, and we basically wrote it about Blair's new labor [sic]," adding that the song has a universal message, noting that "people forget that what Bill Clinton says before he gets elected is not what Bill Clinton will do when he's in office, and that's not about Bill Clinton, that's about all politicians." At the end of the album version of the song, there is an interlude that samples a UK public service announcement on mad cow disease.

Release
The song was released as a CD single in the UK. A CD single of the song was later released in the US, featuring "Tubthumping" as its B-side. A full-page ad featured in Spin magazine, for the song's parent album mentioned the inclusion of "Amnesia" on the album, was accompanied by partial lyrics.

Reception

Critical
The song was well-received by music critics, many of whom felt the song was one of the better tracks on Tubthumper. Both music critic Robert Christgau and AllMusic's Stephen Thomas Erlewine noted "Amnesia", as well as "Tubthumping", as a highlight of Tubthumper. Larry Flick from Billboard wrote, "Can this group pull off a second hit? It may be a bit tricky duplicating the sales and radio heat of "Thubthumper", but Chumbawamba makes a respectable effort with this booming follow-up. The song lacks some of the magical immediacy of its predecessor, but it wears extremely well with repeated spins. In fact, by the second go round, you'll be bobbin' your head to the track's feel-good disco-fortified beat and chanting along with the song's oddly catchy "Do you suffer from long-term memory loss?" Ultimately, this is quirky good fun 
that deserves a fair shake."

Commercial
The song was a successful follow-up to "Tubthumping", reaching the top 10 in the United Kingdom and Canada. In Canada, "Amnesia" debuted on the RPM Top Singles chart on the issue dated 2 February 1998. It reached its number-seven peak on the chart dated 27 April. The song spent a total of 27 weeks in the Canadian Top 100. In the UK, the song was similarly successful, debuting and peaking at number 10 on the UK Singles Chart dated 31 January 1998.

In the United states, the song was somewhat successful, although it was far less so than "Tubthumping". Though the song failed to enter the Billboard Hot 100, it reached number one on the Bubbling Under Hot 100 Singles chart (the equivalent of number 101 on the Hot 100), spending two weeks overall on the chart. It also peaked at number 19 on the Mainstream Top 40 and number 38 on the Adult Top 40. The song was released to modern rock radio stations, on which "Tubthumping" had received much play; however, "Amnesia" was unsuccessful on that format.

Music video
A music video for the song, featuring the members of the group performing in a theatre, with the audience dancing. As the video progresses, the audience members leave until a janitor is the only one still watching. The video was put into rotation on MTV Europe and MuchMusic.

Media usage
The radio edit of the song was included on the original TV soundtrack for Sabrina the Teenage Witch.

Track listings

European single
 "Amnesia" (single mix) (2:55)
 "Amnesia" (album version) (3:45)
 "Amnesia" (acoustic version) (3:02)
 "Amnesia" (Done Lying Down version) (3:40) (performed by Done Lying Down)
 "Amnesia" (Jimmy Echo version) (2:45) (vocals by Jimmy Echo)

UK CD1 single
 "Amnesia" (single mix) (2:55)
 "Amnesia" (Done Lying Down version) (3:40) (performed by Done Lying Down)
 "Amnesia" (Jimmy Echo version) (2:45) (vocals by Jimmy Echo)
 "Amnesia" (Zion Train 359 Amhurst Road Mix) (remix by Zion Train)
 "Amnesia" (Decontrol Remix) (remix by Decontrol)

UK CD2 single
 "Amnesia" (single mix) (3:15)
 "Tubthumping" (single mix) (3:34)
 "Tubthumping" (Escape from New York's Full English Breakfast Mix) (6:24)
 "Tubthumping" (Tin Tin Out Mix) (4:53)

US promo
 "Amnesia" (album version) (3:22)
 "Amnesia" (radio remix) (3:10)
 "Amnesia" (Phillips Milk of Amnesia Mix) (3:44) (remix by Philip Steir)
 "Amnesia" (Random Access Memory Loss Mix) (8:50) (remix by Philip Steir)

Japanese mini-album
 "Amnesia" (single mix)
 "Tubthumping" (country & western Version)
 "Mouthful of Shit" (country & western Version)
 "One By One" (acoustic version)
 "Drip, Drip, Drip" (country & western Version)
 "The Big Issue" (acoustic version)
 "Stitch That" (country & western Version)
 "Amnesia" (acoustic version)
 "Amnesia" (Done Lying Down version) (performed by Done Lying Down)
 "Amnesia" (Jimmy Echo version) (vocals by Jimmy Echo)

Charts

Weekly charts

Year-end charts

Release history

References

External links
 Music video

1997 songs
1998 singles
Chumbawamba songs
EMI Records singles
Republic Records singles